Springhurst is a town in north-eastern Victoria, Australia. Springhurst is close to its surrounding township of Wangaratta 16 km from Springhurst having been situated on the main Artery between Melbourne and Sydney on the (Hume Fwy) and with the railway station in town it was previously on the an old disused train branch to Wahgunyah which close in the early 1990s. its proximity to Rutherglen has attracted attention to run the disused railway line as a rail trail to Bowser. Recently the township has run a Friday night social group in the recreation hall to get to know others around the town.

Transport links
Springhurst has a train station on the North East line from Albury to Melbourne on the North East Line Springhurst railway station

Springhurst Also has a Road Coach connection from 
Corowa to Wangaratta via Rutherglen that departs from the Post Office on Monday to Friday

Springhurst Football Club
It appears that the Springhurst Football Club was first established in 1893  and folded at the same time as the Chiltern & District Football Association, after the 1956 season.

In 1905, Springhurst defeated Chiltern Valley No.2 to win the Federal Junior Football Association premiership.

Springhurst FC competed in the Chiltern & District Football Association in the following years - 1913 & 14, 1919 to 1924, 1926 & 1927, 1930, 1933 to 1937, 1939, 1950 to 1956.

In 1920, Springhurst went through the season without losing a game and defeated Lake Rovers in the Chiltern & District Football Association grand final.

Springhurst FC played in the Ovens and Murray Football League in 1921, but returned to the Chiltern & District Football Association in 1922.

References

Towns in Victoria (Australia)
Rural City of Wangaratta
Hume Highway